Nikola Tsolov (born 21 December 2006) is a Bulgarian racing driver who is the current champion of the F4 Spanish Championship and a member of the Alpine Academy. He is currently racing with ART Grand Prix in the 2023 FIA Formula 3 Championship.

Career

Karting
The Bulgarian lion (a nickname that he gained early in his career) started his karting career in 2016, supported by his father. He become a Republic champion in 2016 and 2017 in the Bulgarian Mini class. In 2018 he moved to the Italian championships. Driving one of Kart Republic’s machines for DPK Racing adorned in the colours of Fernando Alonso’s FA Racing outfit, Tsolov was one of the breakout stars this year having gone from Mini to OK-J to OK in successive years.

He won the WSK Open Cup in 60 Mini karts in 2019, came seventh in the junior world championship last year and then was absolutely on it at the senior level in 2021. Tsolov was invited by Fernando Alonso to drive alongside him in the 2021 edition of 24h Endurance race in Dubai, where they finished 3rd.

Formula 4

2022 
After being on the radar of Fernando Alonso for 2 years, in March 2022 the Two times world champion announced the start of A14 Management with Tsolov and Clément Novalak becoming the first drivers joining the program, with Tsolov granting a place in the F4 Spanish Championship for 2022. On 10 March 2022, Tsolov was announced as a driver of Campos. He started Spanish F4 season at Algarve with double pole. On the first race he started on pole, but unfortunately finished 14th, after a problem at the start, gained a 5th place on the second and won the third start with setting the fastest lap in every race. He kept the good pace in the second round on the Circuito de Jerez with setting a poleposition and a fast lap in all three races with finishing second on the first race and winning second and third race which made him a leader in the championship. The next weekend on Circuit Ricardo Tormo he completed his full domminance, winning all three starts with geting 2 pole-positions and another 3 fastest laps. Tsolov secured his championship win on 2 October, after finishing second in the third race on Circuito de Navarra, winning the title 3 races before the end of season.

Formula Regional Middle East

In February 2023, Tsolov took part in the last round of 2023 Formula Regional Middle East Championship driving for R&B Racing by GRS, as part of his preparation for Formula 3 season. In the first race in the weekend he finished in 9th place, finishing on 6th place in the second race and 15th in the third one. He was  the only driver to score points for R&B Racing in the championship.

FIA Formula 3
In September 2022, Tsolov took part in the FIA Formula 3 post-season test, driving for ART Grand Prix. On 19 December it was announced that he will be one of ART Grand Prix drivers for the 2023 season.

Formula One
Tsolov became a member of the Alpine Affiliate programme in March 2022. On 14 February 2023 he was promoted to a full member of Alpine Academy.

Karting record

Karting career summary

Complete CIK-FIA Karting European Championship results 
(key) (Races in bold indicate pole position) (Races in italics indicate fastest lap)

Complete Karting World Championship results

Racing record

Racing career summary

Complete F4 Spanish Championship results 
(key) (Races in bold indicate pole position) (Races in italics indicate fastest lap)

Complete Formula Regional Middle East Championship results
(key) (Races in bold indicate pole position) (Races in italics indicate fastest lap)

 – Driver did not finish the race but was classified, as he completed more than 90% of the race distance.
* Season still in progress.

Complete FIA Formula 3 Championship results 
(key) (Races in bold indicate pole position) (Races in italics indicate points for the fastest lap of top ten finishers)

References

External links
 Career statistics from Driver Database

2006 births
Living people
Sportspeople from Sofia
Bulgarian racing drivers
Spanish F4 Championship drivers
Campos Racing drivers
FA Racing drivers
Karting World Championship drivers
FIA Formula 3 Championship drivers
ART Grand Prix drivers
Formula Regional Middle East Championship drivers